The String Quintet No. 2 in B flat major, Op. 87, was composed by Felix Mendelssohn in 1845, when Mendelssohn was around 36 years old. The piece is scored for two violins, two violas and cello.

Movements 

Like all of Mendelssohn's string quartets, this work has four movements:

 Allegro vivace
 Andante scherzando
 Adagio e lento
 Allegro molto vivace

A typical performance lasts just under 30 minutes.

It was published posthumously in 1851 (described by its first publisher, Breitkopf und Härtel, as No. 16 der nachgelassenen Werke.)

External links 

Performance of String Quintet No. 2 by the Musicians from Ravinia's Steans Institute from the Isabella Stewart Gardner Museum in MP3 format

Chamber music by Felix Mendelssohn
Mendelssohn 2
1845 compositions
Compositions in B-flat major
Compositions by Felix Mendelssohn published posthumously